Pteronarcella is a genus of giant stoneflies in the family Pteronarcyidae. There are at least two described species in Pteronarcella.

Species
These two species belong to the genus Pteronarcella:
 Pteronarcella badia (Hagen, 1874) (least salmonfly)
 Pteronarcella regularis (Hagen, 1874) (dwarf salmonfly)

References

Further reading

 
 

Plecoptera
Articles created by Qbugbot